Rashtrapati Scout/Guide Award is an award presented by the President of India. The nominees are required to serve as a Rajya Puraskar Scout for at least one year.

Requirements for Eligibility 
Apart from the Rajya Puraskar, the candidate should:

 Should have camped for three consecutive days with his troops. 
 Should have been able to create a shelter of sorts (hut or machan) from natural resources available for capacity of two people to sleep in
 Have a disaster management badge
 Have an ambulance man badge

References 

Scout and Guide awards